Judith Iyabo Shekoni is an English actress, television personality and businesswoman

Early life and education
Born to a Yoruba Nigerian father and a British mother of English and Spanish descent, Shekoni is from Gorton, Manchester and was brought up by a single parent in council housing. She briefly enrolled in a business programme at the University of Westminster.

Career
Shekoni began her television career with a breakout role as  Marjorie "Precious" Hudson (née Hulton) in the BBC1 soap EastEnders. She then moved into film with roles including Garfield 2 for Fox, The Strange Case of Dr. Jekyll and Mr. Hyde as Renee and Ali G Indahouse.

Shekoni lived and studied in Los Angeles for 10 years and appeared on US television shows including NCIS, All of Us and Damages, Fat Friends and The King of Queens.

Whilst in Los Angeles she worked with Bill Condon in the film The Twilight Saga: Breaking Dawn Part 2. She joined the cast as a lead in Heroes Reborn in 2015, the NBC reboot of the original Heroes TV Show, where she played Joanne Collins opposite Zachary Levi.

Relocating back to the UK in 2016, Shekoni appeared in the second season of the BBC1 drama Ordinary Lies written by Bafta winning writer Danny Brocklehurst airing in November 2016. She then filmed 2 seasons as the female lead opposite Donald Sutherland and Ray Winston for the American cable series  Ice, directed by Antoine Fuqua (Training day, Magnificent Seven) appearing as Lady Rah, the kingpin of LA Diamond Trade.

Remaining in London, she starred as Shrike in Maleficent: Mistress of Evil for Disney, with Angelina Jolie and Michelle Pfieffer.

Business
Shekoni co-founded with British model Amanda Van Annan Extension Evolution, a company supplying hair extensions, and is also the founder of two other companies, Make It America and Actors Evolution. She is the CEO of Global WPM, Atap Productions, and is affiliated with the Helen Barber foundation.

Filmography

Film

Television

References

External links
 
 
 http://www.makeitamerica.com/

Living people
1978 births
20th-century English actresses
21st-century English actresses
Actresses from Manchester
Black British actresses
English child actresses
English female models
English film actresses
English people of Nigerian descent
English people of Spanish descent
English people of Yoruba descent
English soap opera actresses
English television actresses
English television presenters
People from Gorton